Anika Shay Wells (born 11 August 1985) is an Australian politician who has been a member of the House of Representatives since the 2019 federal election. She is a member of the Australian Labor Party (ALP) and represents the Division of Lilley in Queensland. Wells is currently the Minister for Aged Care and Minister for Sport.

Early life
Wells was born in Brisbane, Queensland, on 11 August 1985. Her father, an accountant, was born in Melbourne and her mother, an administrator, was born in New Zealand. As a result, Wells held New Zealand citizenship by descent until February 2018, when she renounced it to stand for parliament.

Wells graduated Moreton Bay College as school captain. She holds arts and law degrees from Griffith University as well as a graduate diploma in legal practice from the Australian National University.

Career
Prior to entering politics, Wells worked as an adviser to the federal government for five years. She was admitted to practise law in 2012 and joined Maurice Blackburn in 2014 as a compensation lawyer. She worked on a number of cases related to immigration detention.

Politics
In March 2018, Wells won Labor preselection for the Division of Lilley, replacing the retiring member Wayne Swan. She won the seat at the 2019 federal election despite a five-point swing against the ALP on the two-party-preferred count. At the time, Wells was Australia's youngest female MP at 34.

Wells served on the "Inquiry into the destruction of 46,000-year-old caves at the Juukan Gorge in the Pilbara region of Western Australia", which delivered its interim report in December 2020.

Wells went into the May 2022 federal election on a margin of 0.6 per cent in Lilley but emerged with a first preference swing toward Labor of 6.48 per cent. The election of a Federal Labor government precipitated her elevation to the ministry. Wells is a member of Queensland's Labor Right and the party's rules on affirmative action meant Blair MP Shayne Neumann was relegated to the backbench after serving on the shadow frontbench. On 31 May Prime Minister Anthony Albanese announced his ministry. Wells was named Minister for Aged Care and Minister for Sport.

Personal life
Wells already had one daughter when she entered parliament. She and husband Finn added twin sons in 2020.

References

 

Australian Labor Party members of the Parliament of Australia
Members of the Australian House of Representatives
Members of the Australian House of Representatives for Lilley
Labor Right politicians
Living people
Australian women lawyers
Women members of the Australian House of Representatives
Griffith University alumni
Australian National University alumni
People who lost New Zealand citizenship
Australian people of New Zealand descent
21st-century Australian women politicians
21st-century Australian politicians
1985 births